Chilacis is a genus of true bugs in the family Artheneidae. There are at least two described species in Chilacis.

Species
These two species belong to the genus Chilacis:
 Chilacis typhae (Perris, 1857) (bulrush bug)
 † Chilacis univestis Statz & Wagner, 1950

References

Further reading

External links

 

Lygaeoidea
Articles created by Qbugbot